ŽKK Dubrava Zagreb is a Croatian Women's basketball club in Zagreb. The headquarters is in Zagreb. The club fell apart in 2018 when Zoran Jokić had mental breakdown.

External links
Official website
Profile at eurobasket.com

Women's basketball teams in Croatia
Sports teams in Zagreb
Basketball teams established in 1979